Shoucheng Zhang (February 15, 1963 – December 1, 2018) was a Chinese-American physicist who was the JG Jackson and CJ Wood professor of physics at Stanford University. He was a condensed matter theorist known for his work on topological insulators, the quantum Hall effect, the quantum spin Hall effect, spintronics, and high-temperature superconductivity. According to the National Academy of Sciences:He discovered a new state of matter called topological insulator in which electrons can conduct along the edge without dissipation, enabling a new generation of electronic devices with much lower power consumption. For this ground breaking work he received numerous international awards, including the Buckley Prize, the Dirac Medal and Prize, the Europhysics Prize, the Physics Frontiers Prize and the Benjamin Franklin Medal.

Zhang founded the venture capital firm Danhua Capital.

Biography
Zhang was born in Shanghai, China in 1963. He was accepted by Fudan University in 1978 at the age of 15, and went abroad in 1980 to study at the Free University of Berlin in West Berlin, where he received his B.S. degree in 1983. He then pursued his graduate studies at Stony Brook University (then referred to as State University of New York, Stony Brook). At Stony Brook, he initially studied supergravity (and earned his Ph.D. in 1987) with his advisor Peter van Nieuwenhuizen, before turning to condensed matter on the advice of his personal hero, Nobel laureate Chen-Ning Yang. In the final year at Stony Brook, he switched to condensed matter physics under the supervision of Steven Kivelson.

Zhang was a postdoctoral Fellow at ITP in Santa Barbara from 1987 to 1989. He then joined IBM Almaden Research Center as a Research Staff Member from 1989 to 1993. Thereafter, he joined Stanford University as Assistant Professor of Physics. Beginning in 2004, he concurrently held (by courtesy appointment) titles of Professor of Applied Physics and Professor of Electrical Engineering at Stanford University. In 2007, the "quantum spin Hall effect" discovered by Zhang was named one of the "Top Ten Important Scientific Breakthroughs in the World" by Science Magazine. In 2010, he was named the J. G. Jackson and C. J. Wood Professor in Physics.

In 2009, Zhang was chosen to be a part of an expert panel for the Thousand Talents Program. In 2013, Zhang created Danhua Capital, a venture capital firm, which raised $434.5 million across two funds. Danhua Capital's major investors include state-owned Beijing government enterprise Zhongguancun Development Group (ZDG), which has been linked to the Chinese technology transfer program Made in China 2025. He also served as an independent non-executive director at Lenovo Group and at Meitu.

Zhang's wife Barbara is a software engineer at IBM. They met in kindergarten, in Shanghai. Together they have two children, a son Brian and a daughter Stephanie.

Zhang died in San Francisco on December 1, 2018, at the age of 55, in an apparent suicide. His family said in a statement that he died "after fighting a battle with depression."

Scientific achievements
Zhang was one of the founders of the field of topological insulators. He made one of the first theoretical proposals of the quantum spin Hall effect. Soon after the initial theoretical proposal, his group theoretically predicted the first realistic quantum spin Hall material in HgTe quantum wells. This prediction was soon confirmed experimentally, launching worldwide research activities. Subsequently, his group predicted numerous novel topological states of matter and topological effects, including the Bi2Se3 family of 3D topological insulators, the topological magneto-electric effect, the quantum anomalous Hall effect in magnetic topological insulators, time-reversal invariant topological superconductors, and the realization of a chiral topological superconductor and of chiral Majorana fermions using the quantum anomalous Hall state in proximity with a superconductor. Most of these predicted properties have now been experimentally observed.

Earlier, Zhang also made significant contributions to other areas of physics. He and collaborators derived a topological (Chern–Simons form) quantum field theoretic description of the novel properties of fractional quantum Hall liquids, and proposed a global phase diagram for the quantum Hall states with many features that have had since been experimentally observed. He generalized the theory of fractional quantum Hall effect to higher dimensions and related it to fundamental particle physics. He also proposed an influential theory of high-temperature superconductivity based on an extended symmetry principle.

In early 2000, Zhang and collaborators revitalized the field of spintronics by proposing an intrinsic spin Hall effect and relating it to geometrical phases in quantum mechanics. This proposal stimulated extensive theoretical and experimental work, and also contributed to later developments concerning the quantum spin Hall effect and topological insulators more generally.

Between the years 2010–2015, Zhang and his group of physicists at Stanford University wrote three theoretical papers where they successfully showed how to test Ettore Majorana's theory of Majorana fermion, or what had previously been only a scientific hypothesis that a particle can be its own antiparticle, without the need of external forces having the same mass with the opposite charge of the electron.

Honors and awards
Zhang was a fellow of the American Physical Society and a fellow of the American Academy of Arts and Sciences. He received the Guggenheim fellowship in 2007, the Alexander von Humboldt Research Prize in 2009, the Europhysics Prize in 2010, the Oliver Buckley Prize in 2012, the Dirac Medal and Prize in 2012, the Physics Frontiers Prize in 2013, the "Nobel-class" Citation Laureates by Thomson Reuters in 2014, and the Benjamin Franklin Medal in 2015. He was identified as one of the top candidates for the Nobel Prize by Thomson Reuters in 2014. He was elected as a member of the US National Academy of Sciences in 2015.

Fellow, American Physical Society
Fellow, American Academy of Arts and Sciences
Guggenheim Fellow, 2007
Alexander von Humboldt Research Prize, 2009
Europhysics Prize, 2010
Oliver Buckley Prize, 2012 
Dirac Medal of the ICTP, 2012 
Physics Frontier Prize, 2013 
"Nobel-class" Citation Laureates by Thomson Reuters, 2014 
Benjamin Franklin Medal, 2015 
Member, National Academy of Sciences (NAS)
Foreign Member, Chinese Academy of Sciences

Selected publications
"Quantum spin hall effect in HgTe quantum well theoretically predicted"
"Quantum spin hall effect in HgTe quantum well experimentally demonstrated"
"Topological field theory of time-reversal invariant insulators"
"Topological insulators in Bi2Se3, Bi2Te3 and Sb2Te3"
Topological insulators and superconductors". Reviews of Modern Physics

References

External links
Former Stanford profile page of Shoucheng Zhang (via Archive.org)
Former Stanford web page of S.C.Zhang Group (via Archive.org)

1963 births
2018 suicides
American physicists
Chinese emigrants to the United States
Foreign members of the Chinese Academy of Sciences
Free University of Berlin alumni
Fudan University alumni
Members of the United States National Academy of Sciences
Physicists from Shanghai
Stanford University Department of Physics faculty
Stony Brook University alumni
Academic staff of Tsinghua University
Educators from Shanghai
Oliver E. Buckley Condensed Matter Prize winners
Suicides in California
Fellows of the American Physical Society